Sage is an unincorporated community in Izard County, Arkansas, United States. Sage has a post office with ZIP code 72573.

A strong EF2 tornado struck the town on March 6, 2022, causing major damage to several structures and injuring six people.

Education 
Public education for elementary and secondary students is provided by the Melbourne School District, which leads students to graduate from Melbourne High School.

Highway
 Arkansas Highway 69 Business

References

Unincorporated communities in Izard County, Arkansas
Unincorporated communities in Arkansas